Mario Alejandro Trejo Castro (born 9 March 1999) is a Mexican professional footballer who plays as a defender for Atlético Morelia.

International career
In April 2019, Trejo was included in the 21-player squad to represent Mexico at the U-20 World Cup in Poland.

Career statistics

Club

Honours
Morelia
Liga de Expansión MX: Clausura 2022

References

1999 births
Living people
Mexican footballers
Mexico youth international footballers
Association football defenders
Atlético Morelia players
Liga MX players
Liga Premier de México players
Footballers from Sinaloa
People from Ahome Municipality
Mexico under-20 international footballers